This is a list of the types of craft to be found on the canals and non-tidal rivers of the United Kingdom for which the Canal and River Trust have a licence category:
Thames sailing barges, 
Barges
Dutch barges 
Cabin cruisers
Canoes and kayaks
Mersey flat
Narrowboats
Stand-up paddleboard
Open powered boats
Rowing boats
Sail boats
Widebeams

Notes

References
 

Boat types
Canals in the United Kingdom
Houseboats
Lists of watercraft types